The 4th Commando Brigade is one of the 12 infantry brigades in Turkish Land Forces. It's under the 8th Corps and is headquartered at Tunceli. It was involved in Operation Olive Branch (2018) in Syria and fought in Operation Claw (2019) with the Gendarmerie Special Operations in Iraq.

See also 

 List of commando units#Turkey

References 

Commando brigades of Turkey